Jacoba "Coba" Adriana van der Lee (1893-1972) was a Dutch artist.

Biography 
Van der Lee was born on 6 January 1893 in Rotterdam. In 1911 she married the painter  with whom she had two children. Her work was included in the 1939 exhibition and sale Onze Kunst van Heden (Our Art of Today) at the Rijksmuseum in Amsterdam. She was a member of the Vereniging van Beeldende Kunstenaars (Association of Visual Artists) in Hilversum. Van der Lee died on 4 September 1972 in Hilversum.

References

External links
images of Van der Lee's work on Invaluable

1893 births
1972 deaths
Artists from Rotterdam
20th-century Dutch women artists